White High School may refer to:

 Edward Douglas White Catholic High School, Thibodaux, Louisiana
 Edward H. White High School, Jacksonville, Florida
 Fort White High School, Fort White, Florida
 W. T. White High School, Dallas, Texas